The Merry Husband (German: Der lustige Ehemann) is a 1919 German silent comedy film directed by Léo Lasko and starring Victor Janson, Irmgard Bern and Marga Köhler.

The film's sets were designed by the art director Kurt Richter.

Cast
 Victor Janson as Dr. Helfer / Randolfi 
 Irmgard Bern
 Marga Köhler
 Heddy Jendry
 Wally Koch

References

Bibliography
 Monaco, James. The Encyclopedia of Film. Perigee Books, 1991.

External links

1919 films
Films of the Weimar Republic
German silent feature films
Films directed by Léo Lasko
German black-and-white films
1919 comedy films
German comedy films
UFA GmbH films
Silent comedy films
1910s German films